Mike Emanuel (born December 10, 1967) is the Chief Washington Correspondent and a former White House Correspondents' Association for Fox News. He has worked for the network since July 1997. Emanuel has been based in the Fox News bureaus in Los Angeles, Dallas, and Washington. He hosts Fox News Live on Saturday/Sunday and regularly fills-in on Special Report, Fox News @ Night, and Fox News Sunday.

Prior to working for Fox News Channel, Mike Emanuel was a television journalist anchor/reporter for local TV stations in Midland-Odessa, Texas, Waco, Texas, Austin, Texas, and Los Angeles.

Emanuel grew up in Westfield, New Jersey. He holds a degree in Communication from Rutgers College of Rutgers University in New Brunswick, New Jersey. During his college years, Emanuel announced Rutgers sports on WRSU-FM.

Mike Emanuel is Greek-American and an Orthodox Christian.

References

External links
 https://www.foxnews.com/person/e/mike-emanuel
 https://www.politico.com/news/2019/12/10/playbook-birthday-mike-emanuel-079814
 https://blogs.goarch.org/blog/-/blogs/meet-mike-emmanuel-an-oratorical-teen-turned-political-correspondent

Living people
1967 births
American television reporters and correspondents
Fox News people
People from Westfield, New Jersey
Members of the Orthodox Church in America